Hasanabad (also Romanized as Ḩasanābād; also known as Tāzehābād) is a village in Rudpey-ye Shomali Rural District, in the Central District of Sari County, Mazandaran Province, Iran.

It is located on the Caspian Sea.

At the 2006 census, its population was 80, in 20 families.

References 

Populated places in Sari County
Populated coastal places in Iran
Populated places on the Caspian Sea